Hodie Christus natus est (Latin for "Today Christ is born") is a Gregorian chant sung at Christmas. It exists in various versions.

The words are also the title of various sacred works:
 a mass by Giovanni Pierluigi da Palestrina
 a motet by Giovanni Gabrieli
 a motet by Francis Poulenc

References

Christmas music
Year of song unknown